Seggeurius was a genus of herbivorous hyrax-grouped mammal.

References

Prehistoric hyraxes
Prehistoric placental genera